The Dodecanese campaign of World War II was an attempt by Allied forces to capture the Italian Dodecanese islands in the Aegean Sea following the Armistice with Italy in September 1943, and use them as bases against the German-controlled Balkans. Operating without air cover, the Allied effort was a costly failure, the whole of the Dodecanese falling to the Germans within two months. The Dodecanese campaign, lasting from 8 September to 22 November 1943, resulted in one of the last major German victories in the war.

Background

The Dodecanese island group lies in the south-eastern Aegean Sea, and had been under Italian control since the Italo-Turkish War in 1911. During Italian rule, the strategically well-placed islands became a focus of Italian colonial ambitions in the Eastern Mediterranean. Rhodes, the largest of the islands, was a major military and aerial base. The island of Leros, with its excellent deep-water port of Lakki (Portolago), was transformed into a heavily fortified aeronautical base, "the Corregidor of the Mediterranean", as Benito Mussolini, the Italian leader, boasted. An early British attempt to contest Italian control of the Dodecanese, codenamed Operation Abstention, was thwarted in February 1941, when Italian forces recaptured the island of Kastellorizo from British commandos.

After the Battle of Greece in April 1941 and the Allied defeat in the Battle of Crete in May 1941, Greece and its many islands were occupied by the Axis powers. With the defeat of Axis forces in the North African campaign in May 1943, Winston Churchill, the British Prime Minister, envisaged an operation to capture the Dodecanese and Crete, to deprive the Axis of excellent forward bases in the Mediterranean and to apply pressure on neutral Turkey to join the war. This would promote a favorite idea of Churchill's, that of a "route through the Dardanelles to Russia as an alternative to the Arctic convoys." In the Casablanca Conference, the go-ahead was given and Churchill ordered his commanders to have plans ready for 27 January 1943.

Operation Accolade called for a direct attack on Rhodes and Karpathos, with three infantry divisions, an armored brigade and support units. Landings at Crete, which was too well fortified and had a strong German garrison, were dropped. The main problem faced by the planners was the difficulty of countering Fliegerkorps X of the  because of a lack of air cover, as American and British aircraft were based in Cyprus and the Middle East. This challenge was exacerbated by the demands of the upcoming Allied invasion of Sicily. The Americans were sceptical about the operation, which they regarded as aiming mostly at post-war political benefits for Britain and an unnecessary diversion from the Italian campaign. They refused to support it, warning the British that they would have to go it alone.

As an Italian surrender became increasingly possible, in August 1943 the British prepared to take advantage of a possible Italian-German split, in the form of a smaller version of Accolade. A force based on the 8th Indian Infantry Division was assembled and American assistance in the form of P-38 Lightning long-range fighter squadrons was requested. As a result of the Quebec Conference and the US refusal to assent to British plans, the forces and ships earmarked for Accolade were diverted barely a week before the surrender of Italy in the Armistice of Cassibile on 8 September.

Prelude

Fall of Rhodes

On the announcement of the armistice, the Italian garrisons on most of the Dodecanese Islands either wanted to change sides and fight with the Allies or go home. Anticipating the Italian armistice, German forces, based largely in mainland Greece, had been rushed to many of the islands to maintain control. The German forces were part of Army Group E commanded by the  General Alexander Löhr. This division was formed during the summer on the island of Rhodes, which was the administrative center of the Dodecanese Islands and had three military airfields. Because of this, Rhodes was the principal military objective for both sides.

On 8 September 1943, the Italian garrison on the island of Kastelorizo surrendered to a British detachment, which was reinforced during the following days by ships of the Allied navies. The next day, a British delegation, headed by George Jellicoe, was dropped by parachute on Rhodes, to persuade the Italian commander,  Inigo Campioni, to join the Allies. Swift action by the German forces forestalled the Allies; Kleemann attacked the 40,000-strong Italian garrison on 9 September and forced it to surrender by 11 September. The loss of Rhodes dealt a critical blow to Allied hopes. Many Italian soldiers in the Aegean were tired of the war and had become opposed to Mussolini. Italian Fascist loyalists remained allied to Germany in the Greek campaign. German forces in Greece convinced 10,000 Italians in the Aegean to continue to support their war effort.

Despite this setback, the British pressed ahead with the occupation of the other islands, especially the three larger ones of Kos, Samos, and Leros. The Germans were known to be overstretched in the Aegean, while the Allies enjoyed superiority at sea and the air cover provided by 7 Squadron, SAAF and 74 Squadron, RAF (Supermarine Spitfires) at Kos was deemed sufficient. It was hoped that from these islands, with Italian cooperation, an assault against Rhodes could be eventually launched. From 10 to 17 September, the 234th Infantry Brigade (Major-General Francis Brittorous) coming from Malta, together with 160 men from the Special Boat Service, 130 men from the Long Range Desert Group, A Company of the 11th Battalion, Parachute Regiment and Greek Sacred Band detachments had secured the islands of Kos, Kalymnos, Samos, Leros, Symi, Castellorizo and Astypalaia, supported by ships of the Royal Navy and Royal Hellenic Navy. By 19 September, Karpathos, Kasos and the Italian-occupied islands of the Sporades and the Cyclades were in German hands. On 23 September, the 22nd Infantry Division under  Friedrich-Wilhelm Müller, which was garrisoning Fortress Crete, was ordered to take Kos and Leros.

Battle

Battle of Kos

Having identified the vital role of the Allies' only airfield at Kos,  X bombed it and the Allied positions of the island, from 18 September. Reinforcements gave the Germans 362 operational aircraft in the Aegean by 1 October. The British forces on Kos numbered about 1,500 men, 680 of whom were from the 1st Durham Light Infantry, the rest being mainly RAF personnel and  Italians of the 10th Regiment, 50th Infantry Division Regina. The British withdrew under cover of night and surrendered the next day. The fall of Kos was a major blow to the Allies, since it deprived them of air cover. The Germans captured 1388 British and 3145 Italian prisoners. On 4 October, German troops committed the Massacre of Kos, killing the captured Italian commander of the island,  Felice Leggio, and nearly 100 of his officers.

Battle of Leros

After the fall of Kos, the Italian garrison of Kalymnos surrendered, providing the Germans with a valuable base for operations against Leros. (Operation Leopard) was originally scheduled for 9 October but on 7 October, the Royal Navy intercepted and destroyed the German convoy headed for Kos. Several hundred men and most of the few German heavy landing craft were lost; replacements were transported by rail and it was not until 5 November that the Germans had assembled a fleet of 24 light infantry landing craft. To avoid interception by the Allied navies, they were dispersed among several Aegean islands and camouflaged.

The Allied garrison of Leros consisted of most of the 234th Infantry Brigade with  men of the 2nd The Royal Irish Fusiliers (Lieutenant Colonel Maurice French), the 4th The Buffs (The Royal East Kent Regiment), 1st The King's Own Royal Regiment (Lancaster) and the 2nd Company, 2nd Queen's Own Royal West Kent Regiment (Brigadier Robert Tilney), who assumed command on 5 November. There were also  Italians, mostly naval personnel, under  Luigi Mascherpa.

Leros had been subjected to air attack by the  beginning on 26 September which caused significant casualties and damage to the defenders of the island and supporting naval forces. In the early hours of 12 November, the invasion force in two groups approached the island from east and west. Despite failures in some areas, the Germans established a bridgehead, while airborne forces landed on Mt. Rachi, in the middle of the island. After repulsing Allied counter-attacks and being reinforced the following night, the Germans quickly cut the island in two and the Allies surrendered on 16 November. The Germans suffered 520 casualties and captured 3,200 British and 5,350 Italian soldiers.

Naval operations
Since the operational theater was dominated by a multitude of islands and the Allies and Germans had to rely on naval vessels for reinforcements and supplies, the naval component of the campaign was especially pronounced. Initially, naval presence on both sides was low, most of the Allied shipping and warships having been transferred to the central Mediterranean in support of the operations in Italy, while the Germans did not have a large naval force in the Aegean. The Germans had air superiority, which caused the Allies many losses in ships. Vice Admiral Werner Lange, German Naval Commander-in-Chief of the Aegean, tried to reinforce the isolated German garrisons and carry out operations against Allied garrisons, while transporting Italian prisoners of war to the mainland. Allied ships tried to intercept the German ships, resulting in heavy losses. On 23 September,  damaged the torpedo boat  and sank the steamer , which had 1,576 Italian captives on board. Another disaster occurred a month later, when USAAF B-25 Mitchells and RAF Beaufighters sank the cargo ship , which had 2,389 Italian POWs, 71 Greek POWs and 204 German guards on board, of whom only 539 were saved.

On 14 September, the first Allied loss occurred, when the Greek submarine RHN Katsonis, was rammed and sunk by U-boat hunter UJ 2101. On 1 October the Italian destroyer  was sunk and on 9 October  was sunk and the cruiser  seriously damaged. At the same time, the short range of Hunt-class destroyers , RHN Pindos and RHN Themistoklis prevented them from intercepting the German invasion convoy headed for Kos. Further losses on both sides followed; after the loss of Kos and friendly air cover, the Allied navies concentrated on supply missions to the threatened islands of Leros and Samos, mostly under the cover of night. From 22 to 24 October,  and Eclipse sank in a German minefield east of Kalymnos, while RHN Adrias lost its prow. Adrias escaped to the Turkish coast and after makeshift repairs, sailed to Alexandria.

On the night of 10/11 November, destroyers ,  and ORP Krakowiak bombarded Kalymnos and  bombarded Kos, where German forces were assembling for the attack on Leros. The German convoy reached Leros on 12 November, escorted by over 25 ships, mostly submarine chasers, torpedo boats and minesweepers. During the subsequent nights, Allied destroyers failed to find and destroy the German vessels, limiting themselves to bombarding the German positions on Leros. With the fall of Leros on 16 November, the Allied ships were withdrawn, evacuating the remaining British garrisons. By that time, the Germans had also used Dornier Do 217s of Kampfgeschwader 100 (KG 100), with their novel Henschel Hs 293 radio-controlled missile, scoring two hits. One caused severe damage to HMS Rockwood on 11 November and another sank  two days later. The Allies lost six destroyers sunk and two cruisers and two destroyers damaged between 7 September and 28 November 1943.

Aftermath
After the fall of Leros, Samos and the other smaller islands were evacuated. The Germans bombed Samos with Ju 87 (Stukas) of I  3 in Megara, prompting the 2,500-strong Italian garrison to surrender on 22 November. Along with the occupation of the smaller islands of Patmos, Fournoi and Ikaria on 18 November, the Germans completed their conquest of the Dodecanese, which they held until the end of the war. Only the island of Castellorizo off the Turkish coast was held by the British and was never threatened. The Dodecanese campaign was one of the last British defeats in World War II and one of the last German victories, while others have labelled it a hapless fiasco which was badly conceived, planned and executed as a "shoestring strategy". The German victory was predominantly due to their possession of air superiority, which caused great loss to the Allies, especially in ships and enabled the Germans to supply their forces. The operation was criticized by many at the time as another useless Gallipoli-like disaster and laid the blame at Churchill's door; perhaps unfairly so, since he had pushed for these efforts to be made far sooner, before the Germans were prepared.

The British failure to capture the Dodecanese sealed the fate of Jews living there. Although Italy had passed the anti-Jewish law of the Manifesto of Race in 1938, Jews living on the Dodecanese islands (and Italian-occupied Greece) experienced much less antisemitism than in the German and Bulgarian occupied zones of Greece, which culminated in March 1943 with deportations to the death camps in occupied Poland. The Italian surrender, the German takeover and the failure of the Allied offensive meant that the haven disappeared. Most of the Dodecanese Jews were murdered by the Germans; 1,700 members of the ancient Jewish community of Rhodes (of a population of about 2,000) were rounded up by the Gestapo in July 1944 and only some 160 of them survived the camps. Out of 6,000 Ladino-speaking Jews in the Dodecanese, about 1,200 people survived by escaping to the nearby coast of Turkey.

More than 4,000 Italians died when the ship sank in a storm; other ships were sunk by British forces. The revival of German fortunes in the eastern Mediterranean helped restore Francisco Franco's confidence in the German war effort, shaken by the Allied landings in North Africa and Italy, and ensured several months of Spanish tungsten exports for German war industry.

See also

 The Guns of Navarone (1957), novel
 The Guns of Navarone (1961), film

References

Sources

External links
 Special Operations in the Dodecanese 
 Account of the Battle of Leros 
 Time lines of World War II

1943 in Greece
Mediterranean Sea operations of World War II
Battles and operations of World War II involving Greece
Battles and operations of World War II involving Italy
Battles and operations of World War II involving Poland
Campaigns, operations and battles of World War II involving the United Kingdom
Conflicts in 1943
 
Military campaigns involving Germany
World War II campaigns of the Mediterranean Theatre
Naval aviation operations and battles